The military history of Luxembourg is central to the formation of Luxembourg as a nation from its formation around Luxembourg Castle in 963. Ruled by the House of Luxembourg in the early medieval period, Luxembourg was subsequently invaded by the Bourbons, Habsburgs, Hohenzollerns, and the French, among others.

19th century 
After the defeat of Napoleon in 1815, Luxembourg was disputed between Prussia and the Netherlands.

The Belgian Revolution of 1830–1839 reduced Luxembourg's territory by more than half, as the predominantly francophone western part of the country was transferred to Belgium. Luxembourg's independence was reaffirmed by the 1839 First Treaty of London and again by the 1867 Second Treaty of London, after the Luxembourg Crisis nearly led to war between Prussia and France. The King of the Netherlands remained Head of State as Grand Duke of Luxembourg, maintaining personal union between the two countries until 1890. At the death of William III, the Dutch throne passed to his daughter Wilhelmina, while Luxembourg (at that time restricted to male heirs by the Nassau Family Pact) passed to Adolph of Nassau-Weilburg.

World War II 

During World War II, Luxembourg abandoned its policy of neutrality, when it joined the Allies in fighting Nazi Germany. It was again invaded and subject to German occupation in the Second World War in 1940, and was formally annexed into the Third Reich in 1942. Its government, exiled to London, set up a small group of volunteers who participated in the Normandy invasion. It became a founding member of the United Nations in 1946, and of NATO in 1949. The contribution Luxembourg makes to its defence and to NATO consists of a small army (currently consisting of around 800 people). As a landlocked country, it has no navy.

Korean War 
During the Korean War, Luxembourg contributed a 44-man contingent, attached to the Belgian contingent, to the United Nations force. Luxembourg achieved the dual distinction of deploying the largest proportion of its military force (10%) amongst all states contributing to the United Nations forces, and suffering the highest proportion of casualties (more than one third) amongst all United Nations contingents.

Present 
Luxembourg also lacks an air force, though the seventeen NATO AWACS aeroplanes are for convenience registered as aircraft of Luxembourg. In accordance with a joint agreement with Belgium, both countries have put forth funding for one A400M military cargo plane, currently on order. Luxembourg still jointly maintains three NATO Boeing 707 model TCAs (for cargo and training purposes) based at NATO Air Base Geilenkirchen.

Notes